Vikram Nath (born 24 September 1962) is a judge of Supreme Court of India. He is a former chief justice of the Gujarat High Court and former judge of Allahabad High Court. He was earlier recommended as chief justice of Andhra Pradesh High Court but the centre disapproved the recommendations. He is the first Chief Justice of a High Court in India to live stream its proceedings on Youtube during the 2020 Covid Pandemic.

He was appointed to the Supreme Court on 31 August 2021. He is scheduled to become the 54th Chief Justice of India, if the convention of seniority is followed.

Early life and career 
Vikram Nath was born in a middle-class family in Kaushambi district of Uttar Pradesh.  He followed the footsteps of his paternal ancestry by pursuing law as a subject and is currently the 4th generation to do so.  Born and raised at Allahabad, Uttar Pradesh. 

He practiced as a lawyer at Allahabad High Court for a period of 17 years. He was elevated as judge of Allahabad High Court on 24 September 2004. He was elevated as Chief Justice of Gujarat High Court on 10 September 2019.

He was elevated as a judge of Supreme Court of India on 26 August 2021 and took oath on 31 August 2021. He is in line to become Chief Justice of India in the year 2027 after the retirement of Justice Surya Kant.

References 

Living people
1962 births
People from Kaushambi district
Justices of the Supreme Court of India
21st-century Indian judges